Herculaneum Dock railway station was the original southern terminus for the Liverpool Overhead Railway. Actually adjacent to Harrington Dock it was named after Herculaneum Dock, a somewhat larger dock beyond the end of the line. It was opened on 6 March 1893 by the Marquis of Salisbury.

The station became a carriage shed on 21 December 1896, upon the LOR's southern extension through the cliffside to Dingle and the subsequent construction of a 'through' station by the same name slightly north of the original.

The station closed, along with the rest of the line on 30 December 1956. No evidence of this station remains.

References

External links
Herculaneum railway station at Disused Stations

Disused railway stations in Liverpool
Former Liverpool Overhead Railway stations
Railway stations in Great Britain opened in 1893
Railway stations in Great Britain closed in 1896
Railway stations in Great Britain opened in 1896
Railway stations in Great Britain closed in 1956